"You're Lookin' at Country" is a country music song written and made famous by Loretta Lynn in 1971. The song peaked at #5 on the Billboard Hot Country Songs and reached #1 on the Canada Country Tracks chart on RPM.

About the song
Lynn wrote "You're Lookin' At Country" in response to viewing the open country while touring on the road. Lynn said in an interview that she was inspired by all the meadows and hills that she saw while passing through the country to write this song. The song was unlike anything Lynn had been releasing at the time, besides "Coal Miner's Daughter" from the previous year. This was because the song did not speak of the common subjects Lynn often used in her songs, such as drunk husbands, adultery, and fighting back.

"I had to write 'You're Lookin' At Country' as a love song or it wouldn't sell", Lynn told Jimmy Guterman in the liner notes for the 1994 box set Honky Tonk Girl: The Loretta Lynn Collection. "But it wasn't a love song. I got the idea from looking at my land. I wanted to write what I saw".

"You're Lookin' At Country" is about Lynn describing how "Country" she is by saying she loves running through corn fields and singing a country hymn. She later goes on to say, if you're lookin' at me, you're lookin' at country, which is the ultimate summary of the song. The song grew quite a response from listeners, and has been said to be one of Lynn's signature songs.

Lynn performed the song when she served as guest host in 1978 on Season 3, Episode 3.08 of "The Muppet Show". In the 1980 motion picture biography of Lynn, Coal Miner's Daughter, Sissy Spacek (who plays Loretta) sings "You're Lookin' At Country" during a concert twice in the film. Spacek sang Lynn's hits herself, and later won her an Academy Award for doing so.

Carrie Underwood covered the song as part of the Loretta Lynn tribute album, Coal Miner's Daughter: A Tribute To Loretta Lynn. The album was released on November 9, 2010.

Lynn performed the song at the 2014 Country Music Association Awards along with fellow country singer Kacey Musgraves.

Chart performance
Decca Records released Lynn's song in May 1971. "You're Lookin' At Country" peaked at No. 5 on Billboard's Hot Country Singles chart in mid-1971, and an album of the same name was released. The album and the single sold fairly well. Only one single was released from the album, which was common for the time.

References

1971 singles
Loretta Lynn songs
Carrie Underwood songs
Songs written by Loretta Lynn
Song recordings produced by Owen Bradley
Decca Records singles
1971 songs